Volodymyr Mykolayovych Atamanyuk (born 13 June 1955) is a retired former Soviet football player and a Ukrainian coach.

External links

1955 births
Living people
Soviet footballers
Ukrainian footballers
Ukrainian football managers
FC Metalurh Zaporizhzhia players
FC Nyva Vinnytsia managers
FC Metalurh Zaporizhzhia managers
Ukrainian Premier League managers
Association football defenders
FC CSKA Kyiv players
FC Mariupol players
FC Stal Kamianske players
Footballers from Donetsk